The Unchanging is the eighth studio album by American singer and songwriter Donna de Lory, independently released on July 24, 2013. De Lory dedicated the album to her late father, Al De Lory: "I'm honoring him with this album. It’s about how my father’s death affected my whole spiritual path.” The Unchanging includes a version of De Lory's 1992 single "Praying for Love", which was featured on her eponymous debut album.

De Lory's cover of George Harrison's "My Sweet Lord" was released as the album's lead single on April 3, 2013. The Atom Smith remix of the album's title track became the second single from the album, when it was sent out for radio airplay on July 18, 2014. The final single from The Unchanging is "Be the Change", which was released as a digital single on July 18, 2015.

Track listing

References 

2013 albums
Donna De Lory albums